Lester B. Pearson High School can refer to:
Lester B. Pearson High School (Calgary), in Calgary, Alberta
Lester B. Pearson High School (Burlington), in Burlington, Ontario
Lester B. Pearson High School (Montreal), in Montreal, Quebec
Lester B. Pearson Catholic High School, in Ottawa, Ontario
Lester B. Pearson Collegiate Institute, in Toronto, Ontario
Lester B. Pearson College in Victoria, British Columbia